Potasznia may refer to the following places in Poland:
Potasznia, Lower Silesian Voivodeship (south-west Poland)
Potasznia, Lublin Voivodeship (east Poland)
Potasznia, Podlaskie Voivodeship (north-east Poland)